Hong Kong Red Cross Youth League, is part of the Red Cross in Hong Kong under the Ministry of Youth Affairs and Volunteers.

The Red Cross Youth League has units usually located in secondary schools and youth centers. The district headquarters also have an open group for students who do not have a Red Cross Youth League Unit in their school. The units are coordinated by the five regional headquarters of the Hong Kong Red Cross. Members are aged from 12 to 17 years old.

The annual events organized by the Red Cross Youth League include competitions in the fields of first aid, nursing, and best service. They also host special days such as World Red Cross Day, community health promotion days, international social days, and award days for outstanding Red Cross youth members.

Youth League Structure 
In general, each Youth League is composed of one Unit Officer (UO), one Head Section Leader (HSL), three Senior Section Leaders (SSL), and five Section Leaders (SL). The core team is responsible for leading and maintaining the entire team. Some Youth Leagues also have the positions of Assistant Unit Officer (AUO) and Youth Unit Trainer (YUT)

Youth organisations based in Hong Kong
Charities based in Hong Kong
Medical and health organisations based in Hong Kong
1950 establishments in Hong Kong
Youth organizations established in 1950